Enrique Goiri Bayo (1879 - 4 April 1925) was a Spanish footballer who played as a midfielder for Athletic Club. He was one of the most important footballers in the amateur beginnings of Athletic Club, being among the 7 founders of the club in 1898, and then serving the club as a player, winning both the 1902 Copa de la Coronación and 1903 Copa del Rey, which were the club's very first piece of silverware. He was then involved in the foundation of Club Athletic de Madrid (now Atlético Madrid) in 1903.

Athletic Club
Born in Bilbao, Goiri was one of the 7 students belonging to the Gymnasium Zamacois who founded the Athletic Club in 1898. To In February 1901, at Café García, a commission made up of Juan Astorquia, José Maria Barquín and Goiri himself was formed with the intention of preparing regulations for a new society, and this regulation was approved on 11 June, and thus, on 5 September 1901, Athletic was officially established in the infamous meeting held in the Café García, in which Goiri was one of the 33 socios (co-founders) of the club. 

He then become one of the first footballers of the newly formed Athletic Club, playing as a midfielder. Together with Juan Astorquia, Alejandro de la Sota, Armand Cazeaux and Walter Evans, he was part of the teams that won the 1902 Copa de la Coronación (as Bizcaya) and the 1903 Copa del Rey, and Goiri featured in both finals, a 2–1 win over FC Barcelona in the 1902 final, and an 3–2 comeback win over Madrid FC in the very first Copa del Rey final in 1903. In the 1904 Copa del Rey Final, Athletic were declared winners again without playing a match after their opponents failed to turn up.

Athletic Club
Enrique Goiri was one of the founders of Athletic's Madrid branch, Athletic de Madrid. He appeared on the club's first board of directors as the treasurer of the club and he was even the referee of the club's very first match on 2 May 1903, coinciding with the commemoration of Dos de Mayo Uprising, which was played at the Tiro del Pichón between the 25 members that formed it, except for the treasurer Enrique Goiri who acted as referee.

Honours
Copa de la Coronación: 1902

Copa del Rey: 1903 and 1904

References

1879 births
1925 deaths
Spanish footballers
Athletic Bilbao footballers
Footballers from Bilbao
Association football midfielders
Spanish referees and umpires